Kacper Roman Zych (born 12 May 2002) is a Polish professional footballer who plays as a striker for GKS Jastrzębie, on loan from MFK Karviná.

Career statistics

References

External links

2002 births
Living people
People from Cieszyn
Association football forwards
Polish footballers
Poland youth international footballers
MFK Karviná players
GKS Jastrzębie players
Czech First League players
Czech National Football League players
Polish expatriate footballers
Expatriate footballers in the Czech Republic
Polish expatriate sportspeople in the Czech Republic